Hessel de Vries (November 15, 1916 in Annen – December 23, 1959 in Groningen), was a Dutch physicist and professor at the University of Groningen who furthered the detection methods and applications of radiocarbon dating to a variety of sciences. The Nobel prize was awarded for in this field in 1960, however de Vries was not a contender, since the prize is not awarded posthumously and Hessel de Vries died in 1959 by committing suicide after murdering an analyst, Anneke Hoogeveen. He has been called "the unsung hero of radiocarbon dating" by Eric Willis, the first director of the radiocarbon-dating laboratory at the University of Cambridge. The 1960 Nobel Prize in Chemistry was awarded to Willard Libby for his radiocarbon-dating method. His other major area of research included studies of human color vision and hearing. De Vries became a member of the Royal Netherlands Academy of Arts and Sciences in 1956.

De Vries effect
In 1958, de Vries showed that baffling anomalies in the carbon-14 dates, observed by Willard Frank Libby for Egyptological samples, were in fact systematic anomalies on a global scale, represented in the carbon-14 dates of tree rings. This phenomenon has been called the "de Vries effect". The correspondence with tree rings, which can be counted (one ring for each year), led to a recalibration of radiocarbon dating that was a large improvement in the accuracy.

Murder and suicide
De Vries committed suicide in 1959, after murdering a former analyst (Anneke Hoogeveen), with whom he was in love but who had become engaged to another man.

References

1916 births
1959 suicides
People from Aa en Hunze
20th-century Dutch physicists
Academic staff of the University of Groningen
Murder in the Netherlands
Members of the Royal Netherlands Academy of Arts and Sciences
1959 murders in the Netherlands